The 79th United States Colored Infantry was an all-black infantry regiment which fought for the Union Army during the Civil War. "... in August, 1862, recruiting for a colored regiment was commenced in Kansas, and over 600 men were soon mustered in. The regiment, however, was not mustered into the United States service until January 13, 1863. It was then designated the 1st Kansas Colored Infantry Regiment, but its name was changed, in December, 1864, to the 79th United States Colored Infantry."

They fought at the  Battle of Fort Smith.

Casualties
The regiment suffered 354 fatalities during its service; 5 officers and 183 enlisted men were killed in action or mortally wounded, 1 officer and 165 enlisted men died from disease or accident.

See also
List of United States Colored Troops Civil War units

References

United States Colored Troops Civil War units and formations